Shaik Ismail (born 25 April 2002) is an Indian cricketer. He made his Twenty20 debut for Andhra in the 2018–19 Syed Mushtaq Ali Trophy on 22 February 2019.

References

External links
 

2002 births
Living people
Indian cricketers
Andhra cricketers
Place of birth missing (living people)